Myrton H. Duel (January 26, 1891 – March 16, 1962) was a member of the Wisconsin State Assembly.

Duel was born on January 26, 1891, in Eldorado, Wisconsin. He served in the United States Army during World War I. He married Matie Tidyman (1899–1990) in 1923. He was elected in 1948 as a member of the Republican Party, defeating Marley G. Kelly. He died in Fond du Lac, Wisconsin on March 16, 1962, and was buried at North Eldorado Cemetery.

References

External links

People from Fond du Lac County, Wisconsin
Republican Party members of the Wisconsin State Assembly
Military personnel from Wisconsin
United States Army soldiers
United States Army personnel of World War I
1891 births
1962 deaths
20th-century American politicians